is a railway station on the Nanao Line in the town of Tsubata, Kahoku District, Ishikawa Prefecture, Japan, operated by the West Japan Railway Company (JR West).

Lines

Station layout
The station consists of one ground-level side platform serving a single bi-directional track. The station is unattended.

Adjacent stations

History
The station opened on February 10, 1960. With the privatization of Japanese National Railways (JNR) on April 1, 1987, the station came under the control of JR West.

Surrounding area

See also
 List of railway stations in Japan

External links

  

Railway stations in Ishikawa Prefecture
Stations of West Japan Railway Company
Railway stations in Japan opened in 1960
Nanao Line
Tsubata, Ishikawa